Twixt Love and Fire is a 1914 short comedy film featuring Fatty Arbuckle.

Cast
 Roscoe 'Fatty' Arbuckle
 Peggy Pearce 
 Cecile Arnold
 Charles Avery
 Harold Lloyd

See also
 List of American films of 1914
 Fatty Arbuckle filmography
 Harold Lloyd filmography

External links

1914 films
1914 comedy films
1914 short films
American silent short films
American black-and-white films
Films directed by George Nichols
Silent American comedy films
American comedy short films
1910s American films